A cillín (plural cilliní) are historic burial sites in Ireland, primarily used for stillborn and unbaptized infants. These burial areas were also used for the recently deceased who were not allowed in consecrated churchyards, including the mentally disabled, suicides, beggars, executed criminals, and shipwreck victims.

Definition and alternative names
The Irish word cillín is defined as  a small church or "cell" as in prison cell or monastic cell. In Ireland, a cillín can also be called a caldragh, calluragh, cealltrach, ceallúrach and lisín, depending upon the location of the site within Ireland.  English versions  of cillíns  include: cill burial grounds, kyle burial grounds, killeens and children's burial grounds.

The types of locations used for these unconsecrated grounds include: abandoned graveyards and churches, castle ruins, ancient earthenworks and megalithic cairns. The name cillín is used primarily in Ulster. As of 2013, there were approximately 1440 known children's burial grounds in Northern Ireland and the Republic of Ireland, including 500 sites listed in County Galway and 250 sites in County Kerry.

History

In the  early Christian Church, the baptism of a newborn baby was of primary importance. In some regions, but not all regions, the Catholic Church prohibited the burial of unbaptized babies in consecrated graveyards. It is not known when people began to use separate burial grounds in Ireland. There is no historical evidence that supports the use of alternative burial grounds during the early medieval period. The earliest historical reference to the use of cilliní in Ireland was in 1619. It has been theorized that cilliní were established during this time period as a result of strict reforms implemented by the Catholic Church during the Counter-Reformation regarding unbaptized infants, and continued to be used until the Second Vatican Council in the 1960s.

Sixteen cilliní were excavated in Ireland from 1966 to 2004. The findings from  the excavations revealed that these sites dated from the mid 1500s to mid 1800s. Historical evidence has shown that  cilliní were carefully selected. Areas with a previous religious function were often used because of the idea of the sacred nature of the site. A characteristic of  many cilliní burials were the placement of white quartz pebbles along with other stone pebbles on the child's grave. Quartz had been used in monastic burials in Great Britain, and may have held a special significance for honoring or cherishing the dead. There is historical evidence that cilliní burials were a respectful process. Graves were often surrounded by stones to mark their outline. Some children were carefully placed during burial, either lying on their back or their sides. In some locations, there were coffin burials or graves lined with stones.

The study of  19th century maps, local histories, and interviews with community elders have  helped preserve the location of many cillíni, but as people moved away from small towns, many of these sites were lost. 
In the 19th century, many of the burial sites were destroyed and converted to farmland. Legislation enacted in Ireland in the mid 1800s's had a profound impact on cilliní burials. The 1863  Act for the Registration of Births and Deaths in Ireland, obligated parents to register the birth and death of their children. There would be no more hidden burials without the penalty of a fine. Priests were also undergoing change by the late 1800s.  There are examples of new arrangements being made at the end of cemeteries to accommodate the burial of unbaptized children.

Cilliní are now recognized as a class of archaeological monument. They have attracted the attention of archaeologists and historians, and have been the subject of study and archaeological excavations throughout Ireland. There has also been recent interest in the depiction of such sites in Irish literary texts such as Tom Murphy's play Bailegangaire and Mary Leland's novel The Killeen (both from 1985). Today, many towns and villages in Ireland are recovering human remains from cilliní and moving these once excluded individuals to consecrated churchyards. Other sites remain intact, and  have been consecrated by special religious ceremonies. In August, 2014, at St. Patrick's Church in Cushendun, a religious ceremony led by the parish priest and attended by many in the community, celebrated the reburial of 19 children's skeletons. The children's remains were discovered during an archeological excavation at  Castle Carra, near Cushendun.

List of selected cillín sites 

 Carnanmore, Curramoney, Antrim
 Drumnascragh, Ballintoy Demesne, Antrim
 Kilmacromey, Araboy, Antrim
 Toberann, Lismorrity, Antrim
 Caltra, County Galway· 
 Carrowkeel, County Galway.
 Clonberne, County Galway.
 Corcullen, Moycullen, County Galway
 Achill Island'', County Mayo
Ridds Green, County Wicklow

See also
Eaves-drip burial
Baptism
Funeral

References 

Cemeteries in Ireland
Cemeteries in the Republic of Ireland
Cemeteries in Northern Ireland
Geographic history of Ireland
Archaeology of death
Stillbirth